Aliabad-e Alanchag (also Romanized as ‘Alīābād-e Ālanchag; also known as ‘Alīābād) is a village in Miankuh Rural District, Chapeshlu District, Dargaz County, Razavi Khorasan Province, Iran. At the 2006 census, its population was 68, in 17 families.

See also 

 List of cities, towns and villages in Razavi Khorasan Province

References 

Populated places in Dargaz County